Mohamma Gaadiyaa is a Maldivian Comedy television drama series developed for Television Maldives, directed by Hassan Haleem. The series stars film stars Mohamed Abdulla, Niuma Mohamed and Ismail Rasheed in main roles. The series was aired on 21 August 2009 on the occasion of 1430 Ramadan.

Cast and characters

Main roles
 Mohamed Abdulla as Mohamma
 Niuma Mohamed as Raqeeba

Recurring roles
 Ismail Rasheed as Burukhan
 Ali Shameel as Yoosube
 Koyya Hassan Manik as Adambe
 Hamdhan Farooq as Labeeb; a DJ artist

Guest roles
 Ravee Farooq as a choreographer (Episode 1)
 Ibrahim Zaid Ali as a music composer (Episode 2)
 Abdul Latheef as a customer (Episode 3)
 Hussain Shibau as Yoosube's friend (Episode 4)
 Aminath Rana as a customer (Episode 5)
 Mohamed Manik as a customer (Episode 5)
 Nadhiya Hassan as a customer (Episode 5)
 Aishath Rasheedha as Mohamma's mother (Episode 5)

Episodes

Soundtrack

References

Serial drama television series
Maldivian television shows